Trasimène  was a department of the First French Empire from 1809-1814  in present-day Italy. It was named after Lake Trasimeno. It was formed on 15 July 1809, when the Papal States were annexed by France. Its capital was Spoleto.

The department was disbanded after the defeat of Napoleon in 1814. At the Congress of Vienna, the Papal States were restored to Pius VII. Its territory is now divided between the Italian provinces of Perugia, Terni, Macerata and Viterbo.

Subdivisions
The department was subdivided into the following arrondissements and cantons (situation in 1812):

 Spoleto, cantons: Arquata, Cascia, Norcia, Spoleto (2 cantons), Terni (2 cantons) and Visso.
 Foligno, cantons: Assisi, Bettona, Bevagna, Foligno, Gualdo, Montefalco, Nocera, Spello and Trevi.
 Perugia, cantons: Castiglione del Lago, Città della Pieve, Città di Castello, Fratta, Monte Santa Maria, Panicale, Passignano and Perugia (3 cantons).
 Todi, cantons: Acquapendente, Amelia, Baschi, Ficulle, Marsciano, Massa, Orvieto and Todi (2 cantons).

Its population in 1812 was approximately 300,000, and its area was approximately 3,357 square Italian miles (11,120 square kilometers).

Under the Roman Republic
A department called Trasimène also briefly existed as a subdivision of the Roman Republic (1798–1799), with the same territory, but with Perugia as its capital city.

References

Former departments of France in Italy
1809 establishments in the First French Empire
History of Umbria